Limbayat is a zonal town in Surat city and one of the hub for shanty towns in Surat. Limbayat has grown in area and population due to amalgamation of municipalities of Godadara and Parvat and town panchayats of Dindoli, Kharavasa. The area is also known for its haphazard development due to growth of migrants in the area.

References 

Suburban area of Surat
Cities and towns in Surat district